The 1981 New Zealand Grand Prix was a race held at the Pukekohe Park Raceway on 10 January 1981. It was the 27th running of the New Zealand Grand Prix and was run over two heats of 30 laps each, with the final results being an aggregate of the two. The event was won by New Zealander Dave McMillan. The podium was completed by fellow Kiwis David Oxton and Steve Millen.

Classification

Qualifying

Grand Prix

References

Grand Prix
New Zealand Grand Prix
January 1981 sports events in New Zealand